Olai Pedersen Wiig (10 October 1802 – 29 September 1887) was a Norwegian politician who served as the mayor of Trøgstad between 1844 and 1847. Wiig served in the Storting between 1845 and 1847, before serving as a deputy member of the Storting between 1848 and 1850, after which he returned to a full member between 1851 and 1870. Wiig served as a deputy member between 1871 and 1873 before finishing off his career as full member between 1874 and 1879.

Early life
Wiig was born on October 10, 1802 in Trøgstad, Norway. He spent most of his early life as a farmer.

Mayor of Trogstad (1844–1847)
Wiig was mayor of Trøgstad briefly between 1844 and 1847. When his term ended, he was succeeded by Zyprian Svendsen Sødtland.

Storting career (1845–1879)
Wiig was elected to the Storting in 1845 as a member from Smaalenenes Amt (Østfold). His first term ended in 1847. In 1848 he was elected as a deputy member, which he served as until 1850. In 1851 he was again elected as a full member, serving 7 terms consecutive. In 1871 he began a term as a deputy member. In 1873 his deputy member term ended. In 1874 he was yet again elected as a full member of the Storting, serving two more terms before retiring to his mill in 1879.

Later years
Wiig retired to the Lier, Norway region, where he founded a cardboard and paper factory, Stiklen cardboard and paper factory, which had around 25 employees circa 1880. Wiig died on 29 September 1887 in Trøgstad.

References

1802 births
1887 deaths
Members of the Storting
Mayors of places in Østfold
People from Trøgstad